In Northern Ireland, the Leader of the Opposition was the leader of the largest political party in the House of Commons of Northern Ireland that was not in the government of the day. The position was eliminated in 1972 when the Stormont Parliament was abolished and replaced by direct rule from London.

The current Northern Ireland Assembly has no formally recognized Leader of the Opposition.

Abstentionism
Through the existence of the Stormont Parliament, members of the Irish nationalist opposition often practiced a policy of abstentionism where they would run for seats in the parliament but refuse to take them if elected in order not to give legitimacy to British rule or the partition of the island and refused to accept recognition as the Official Opposition until 1965 despite the fact that they were the second party in the House of Commons in terms of seats won from 1925 until 1972 and had been tied for second with Sinn Féin (which was also abstentionist) in the first Northern Ireland House of Commons from 1921 to 1925.

Though the Nationalist Party was consistently the second largest party in the House of Commons its members refused to take their seats in the legislature until 1924, then resumed the abstentionist policy in the 1930s to protest the abolition of proportional representation. From 1937, Thomas Joseph Campbell and Richard Byrne were the only Nationalist MPs to take their seats until Byrne's death in 1942 and Campbell's resignation in 1945. It was not until 1965 that the Nationalist Party agreed to form the Official Opposition in the House of Commons. Eddie McAteer served as Leader of the Opposition from 1965 until he lost his seat in the 1969 election. Roderick O'Connor succeeded McAteer as Nationalist Party leader but the party again withdrew from its role as Official Opposition.

The House of Commons 
This is a list of people who served as the de facto Leaders of the Opposition of Northern Ireland, being leaders of the largest party in the House of Commons of Northern Ireland which was not the government.

Northern Ireland Assembly
Pre-2022

After the introduction of power-sharing in the Northern Ireland Assembly, all willing parties who achieved adequate levels of support were invited into the Northern Ireland Executive. Starting in 2016, however, some qualifying parties choose to form an opposition. No "Leader of the Opposition" had been nominated, leaders from the opposition parties(during the 6th assembly) were as follows:

Eamonn McCann (2005–present; People Before Profit)(Gerry Carroll was the party's only MLA)
Jim Allister (2007–present; Traditional Unionist Voice) 

Clare Bailey (2018–2022; Green Party)

Post-2022
Following the SDLP declining to nominate an Infrastructure Minister to the Executive, on the 25th of July 2022 the SDLP formed an opposition and nominated the first Leader of the Opposition for the Assembly. 
Matthew O'Toole (2022-present; Social Democratic and Labour Party)

See also
Parliament of Northern Ireland

Notes

References

Parliament of Northern Ireland
Politicians from Northern Ireland
Northern Ireland